The 2006 Gran Premio Telmex was the fourteenth and final race of the 2006 Bridgestone Presents the Champ Car World Series Powered by Ford season, held on November 12, 2006, on the Autódromo Hermanos Rodríguez in Mexico City, Mexico. The pole was won by Justin Wilson, while the race was won by season champion Sébastien Bourdais, his seventh victory of the year.

Qualifying results

Race

Caution flags

Notes

 New Track Record Justin Wilson 1:24.801 (Qualification Session #2)
 New Race Lap Record Sébastien Bourdais 1:27.644
 New Race Record Sébastien Bourdais 1:51:31.146
 Average Speed 98.504 mph

Final championship standings

 Bold indicates the Season Champion.
Drivers' Championship standings

 Note: Only the top five positions are included.

External links
 Friday Qualification Times
 Saturday Qualification Times
 Race Results

Mexico City
Gran Premio Telmex, 2006
Gran Premio Tecate